Khowai district is a district of Tripura state of India. This district was created in January, 2012 when four new districts were created in Tripura, taking the number of districts in the state from four to eight. The district headquarters are located in the town Khowai. The district was carved out of West Tripura district along with new Sipahijala district. The district is divided into two subdivisions, namely Khowai and Teliamura.

Etymology 
Khowai district derives its name from the namesake Khowai river, which runs across the district in north-south direction almost in the middle.

Geography
Khowai district is surrounded by Kamalpur subdivision of Dhalai district in the east, Sadar subdivision of West Tripura in the west and Amarpur subdivision of Gomati district in the south. Khowai district also shares a border with Bangladesh in the north.

There are 55 gram panchayats and 2 municipalities, namely, Khowai and Teliamura in this district. There are 69 village committees that falls under ADC.

Division
The district is divided into two subdivisions: Khowai subdivision and Teliamura subdivision. Khowai district has been divided into 6 blocks, namely, Khowai, Padmabil, Tulashikhar, Kalyanpur, Teliamura and Mungiakumi.

Demographics 
According to the 2011 census, Khowai district had a population of 327,564. Khowai has a sex ratio of 957 females to 1000 males and a literacy rate of 88.37%. Scheduled Castes and Scheduled Tribes make up 63,062 (19.25%) and 139,537 (42.60%) of the population respectively.

Khowai had 312,338 Hindus, 11,669 Christians and 2,333 Muslims.

At the time of the 2011 census, 51.44% of the population spoke Bengali, 39.55% Kokborok, 2.27% Odia, 1.13% Hindi and 1.07% Mundari as their first language.

Transport 
Railway
Lumding–Sabroom line of Northeast Frontier Railway passes through Khowai district. The main station in district is Teliamura railway station, providing connectivity to Tripura capital Agartala and Assam.

Places of Interest
Places of Interest at Khowai district are as follows:-

1. Baramura Eco Park
2. Chakmaghat Park, Teliamura
3. Banabithi Eco Park, Padmabil, Khowai
4. Jangal Mahal, Khowai

See also 

 List of districts of Tripura

References

External links
 Official website of Khowai district in Tripura
District Census Handbook - West Tripura District Part A (2011) - Before division

 
Khowai